The 2012–13 season is Ludogorets Razgrad's second season in A Football Group, of which they are defending Champions. They will also take part in the Bulgarian Cup, SuperCup and enter the UEFA Champions League at the second qualifying round stage.

Squad

On loan

Transfers

In

Out

Loans out

Released

Friendlies

Competitions

Bulgarian Supercup

A Football Group

League table

Results summary

Results by round

Results

Bulgarian Cup

Champions League

Second qualifying round

Squad statistics

Appearances and goals

|-
|colspan="14"|Players who appeared for Ludogorets Razgrad that left during the season:

|}

Goal scorers

Disciplinary record

References

Ludogorets Razgrad
PFC Ludogorets Razgrad seasons
Bulgarian football championship-winning seasons